David Jhefer Domingues dos Santos (born 10 July 1999), commonly known as David, is a Brazilian footballer who currently plays for Toledo.

Career statistics

Club

Notes

References

1999 births
Living people
Brazilian footballers
Association football forwards
Campeonato Brasileiro Série D players
Toledo Esporte Clube players
Club Athletico Paranaense players
Sportspeople from Pará